Ayitale is a 2013 Nigerian Yoruba film produced and directed by Adebayo Salami.
It received four nominations at the 2013 Best of Nollywood Awards.

Cast
Femi Adebayo
Adebayo Salami
Bimbo Akintola
Joke Muyiwa
Lanre Hassan
Iyabo Oko
Adewale Elesho
Toyin Adegbola
Razak Olayiwola
Tunbosun Odunsi

References

Nigerian drama films
2013 films